Kolexxxion, is a collaborative studio album by DJ/producer DJ Premier and rapper Bumpy Knuckles (a.k.a. Freddie Foxxx). Most of the beats on the album (all produced by DJ Premier except "Word Iz Bond") are beats that were rejected by other artists, such as "B.A.P. (Bumpy And Premier)" (This beat was intended for Jay-Z's 2009 album The Blueprint 3, but by the time DJ Premier had sent it to him, it was too late for the beat to make the cut for the album), and "wEaRe aT WaR" (rejected by Immortal Technique) and "EyEnEvErPuTmY4cUsAwAy" (Premier had himself stated, on Hot 97.5 that he had, on several occasions, sent the beat for rapper Kanye West, but it never made the cut for any of his projects). Some of the songs are previously released collaborations between the two. There are only two guest stars on the album, which are Flavor Flav and Nas. The album was released on March 27.

Singles
 "B.A.P. (Bumpy And Premier)"
The first street single on the album. The single was released on October 27, 2011. The single debuted on DJ Premier's radio show Live from HQ. The B-side to "B.A.P." is "OwNiT" (Which he had not showcased to any other artist).

 "wEaRe aT WaR"
The second single on the album. It was released on January 13. This is a beat that had already been showcased by DJ Premier to rapper Immortal Technique, who rejected it.

 "Shake The Room"
The official 1st single from the album. It was released on February 27, a rejected beat from Busta Rhymes.

Track listing
All songs produced by DJ Premier, except for track 17 ("Word Iz Bond"), produced by Bumpy Knuckles
All songs mixed by DJ Premier, except for track 6 ("P.A.I.N.E.") and track 7 ("The Life"), mixed by Eddie Sancho

Notes

Charts

References

2012 albums
Freddie Foxxx albums
DJ Premier albums
Albums produced by DJ Premier
Collaborative albums